Nine Songs From the Garden of Welcome Lies is the tenth album by composer Paul Schütze, released on September 9, 1997 through Tone Casualties.

Track listing

Personnel 
Alex Buess – engineering, mixing, recording
Andrew Hulme – engineering
Jürg Jecklin – recording
Christian Lichtenberg – design, photography
Paul Schütze – instruments, production, engineering, mixing

References 

1997 albums
Paul Schütze albums
Albums produced by Paul Schütze